HMS Halsted (K556), ex-Russell, was a Captain-class frigate of the Buckley class of destroyer escort, originally intended for the United States Navy. Before she was finished in 1943, she was transferred to the Royal Navy under the terms of Lend-Lease, and saw service from 1943 to 1944 during World War II.

Construction and transfer
The still-unnamed ship was laid down as the U.S. Navy destroyer escort DE-91 by Bethlehem-Hingham Shipyard, Inc., in Hingham, Massachusetts, on 28 July 1943 and was launched on 14 October 1943. She was allocated to the United Kingdom and received the British name Russell, but the British soon changed her name to Halsted (sometimes spelled Halstead). She was transferred to the United Kingdom upon completion on 3 November 1943.

Service history

Commissioned into service in the Royal Navy as HMS Halsted (K556) on 3 November 1943 simultaneously with her transfer, the ship served on patrol and escort duty. On 11 June 1944, she was operating in the English Channel off Cherbourg, France, when German S-boats – known to the Allies as "E-boats" – and the torpedo boats  Jaguar and Möwe of Nazi Germany's Kriegsmarines 5th Torpedo Flotilla attacked her at about 0200. One torpedo struck her forward of her bridge, blowing off most of her bow and damaging her beyond economical repair.

Halsted was declared a constructive total loss and, instead of being returned to the U.S. Navy, was retained by the Royal Navy for spare parts.

Disposal
The U.S. Navy struck Halsted from its Naval Vessel Register on 13 November 1944. The Royal Navy nominally returned her to the U.S. Navy in 1946. She was sold to a Dutch firm for scrapping on either 1 November 1946 or 28 March 1947 (sources vary) and was scrapped in the Netherlands.

References
Navsource Online: Destroyer Escort Photo Archive Reynolds (DE-91) HMS Halsted (K-556)
uboat.net HMS Halstead (K556)
Destroyer Escort Sailors Association DEs for UK
World Naval Ships.com HMS Halstead

External links
Photo gallery of USS Halsted (K556)

 

Captain-class frigates
Buckley-class destroyer escorts
World War II frigates of the United Kingdom
Ships built in Hingham, Massachusetts
1943 ships
Maritime incidents in June 1944